Disco is the first remix album by English synth-pop duo Pet Shop Boys, released on 17 November 1986 by Parlophone in the United Kingdom and by EMI America Records in the United States. Disco consists of remixes of tracks from the band's debut album Please and its respective B-sides. The album includes remixes by Arthur Baker, Shep Pettibone and the Pet Shop Boys themselves.

Background
According to interviews, the album was released to showcase music the duo deemed non-radio friendly. With the exception of "Suburbia", all the mixes on Disco were either rare import remixes or previously unreleased.

In The Night - possibly originally intended for the B-side of the original 12" 1985 release of "Opportunities (Let's Make Lots of Money)" (the sleeve of which lists "In The Night (Extended)" but in fact played the 7" version); previously unreleased

Suburbia - a.k.a. The Full Horror (standard 12" version)

Opportunities - a.k.a. "Version Latina" from the remix 12" of the original 1985 release of "Opportunities", which at the time of the release of Disco was changing hands for up to £100

Paninaro - a.k.a. The Italian Remix a.k.a. The Pet Shop Boys Mix, previously available only on a very limited edition 12" in Italy

Love Comes Quickly - a.k.a. the Shep Pettibone Mastermix, previously available only on 12" in the USA, an edit of which also appeared on the 7" double-pack of "Suburbia"

West End Girls - different from the version released on the remix 12"; previously unreleased

In addition, Pet Shop Boys would later release the remix albums Disco 2, Disco 3 and Disco 4, although the concepts of these compilations differ greatly from the original Disco album: Disco 2 is a continuous mega-mix of dance remixes, Disco 3 is a mixture of remixes and new songs and Disco 4 consists exclusively of tracks remixed by the Pet Shop Boys, mainly by other artists.

The sleeve cover is a still of Chris Lowe from the promo video of "Paninaro", which was directed by Pet Shop Boys themselves.

The Disco mix of "Suburbia" can also be found on the "Suburbia" 12" and the 2001 two-disc re-release of Please.

The original version of "In the Night" was the B-side to the original release of "Opportunities (Let's Make Lots of Money)". Arthur Baker's Extended Mix of "In the Night" was used as the theme for the BBC's The Clothes Show.

Stuart Price, producer of the Pet Shop Boys albums Electric and Super, cites Disco as a major influence on his musical taste as a teenager.

Track listing

Notes
  signifies a remixer

Personnel
Credits adapted from the liner notes of Disco.

 Arthur Baker – remix 
 Pet Shop Boys – production ; remix 
 Phil Harding – production, engineering 
 Julian Mendelsohn – production, mixing 
 Andy Richards – Fairlight 
 Gary Barnacle – saxophone 
 Ron Dean Miller – remix 
 Latin Rascals – remix 
 J. J. Jeczalik – production 
 Nicholas Froome – production 
 Blue Weaver – additional keyboards 
 Khris Kallis – additional keyboards 
 David Jacob – remix, engineering 
 Adrien Cook – Fairlight 
 Shep Pettibone – remix 
 Stephen Hague – production 
 Andy Mackay – saxophone

Charts

Weekly charts

Year-end charts

Certifications and sales

References

1986 remix albums
Albums produced by Julian Mendelsohn
Albums produced by Stephen Hague
Parlophone remix albums
Pet Shop Boys remix albums